Jötunvillur are a set of runic code inscriptions dating back to the Viking Age. Although previously untranslatable, a proposed solution to the code was announced by the runologist K Jonas Nordby in 2014.

See also 
List of runestones

References 

 
Runic inscriptions